Karl Otto Bonnier (20 June 1856 – 26 May 1941) was a Swedish publisher for authors including August Strindberg, Verner von Heidenstam, Gustaf Fröding, Selma Lagerlöf, and Hjalmar Söderberg. He was the son of the founder of the family company, Albert Bonnier.

See also
Bonnier family

References

External links

1856 births
1941 deaths
Swedish publishers (people)
Bonnier family